Tungipara is an upazila of Gopalganj District in the Division of Dhaka, Bangladesh. It is the birthplace of Bangabandhu Sheikh Mujibur Rahman, the founder of independent Bangladesh and his grave is also here. In 1995 it became an Upazila.

Etymology
There is a legend that this area used to be flooded. Some saints who practiced Islam relocated to this area from Persia. They started living in this area by making canopied houses at low cost. Such houses are called "Tong" in Bengali hence the name of the place is Tungipara (Tungi+para). "Para" means neighborhood.

Geography
It is the most southern upazila of Gopalganj District. To the north is Gopalganj Sadar, the east is Kotalipara, on the south Nazirpur and in the west is Chitalmari Upazila of Bagerhat District. Tungipara Upazila has 16,030 households and a total area of 127.25 km2.

The famous river Madhumati divides Tungipara from Bagerhat District & also the divider of Dhaka-khulna division.

Demographics

As of the 1991 Bangladesh census, Tungipara has a population of 88,102. Males constitute 51.25% of the population, and females 48.75%. This Upazila's 18+ population is 42,147. Tungipara has an average literacy rate of 63.3% (7+ years), and the national average of 32.4% literate.

Points of interest

 Mausoleum of Sheikh Mujibur Rahman
 Borni'r Baor
 Madhumati River
 Patgati Bazar
 Baghir River

Administration
Tungipara Upazila is divided into Tungipara Municipality and five union parishads: Barni, Dumuria, Gopalpur, Kushli, and Patgati. The union parishads are subdivided into 34 mauzas and 67 villages.

Tungipara Municipality is subdivided into 9 wards and 13 mahallas.

Education

There are 24 mostly known educational institutes in Tungipara.  It has a Government University College named Sheikh Mujibur Rahaman University college. It also has a Government high School named Gimadanga Tungipara Govt. High School.

College
Govt. Shaikh Muzibur Rahman College, Patgati.
Dr. Imdadul Haque Memorial Degree College, Bashbaria.

School
Govt. Gimadanga Tungipara High School.
Khan Saheb Sheikh Mosarrof Hossain School & College
Guadanga Silna B.B.H High School.
Saptapalli J. High School.
Gopalpur Panchapalli High School.
Nilfa Borni High School.
Kusli Islamia High School.
Basuria S. High School.
Barni High School.
Govt. Bangobandhu Smriti Girls High School.
Gimadanga Ideal High School.
Bashbaria Jhanjhania High School.
Dumuria ML. High School.
Tarail Adarsha High School.
Baladanga SMM High School.
Khan Saheb Sheikh Mosarraf Hossain High School.
Begum Fatema Jr. Girls School.
Treepalli Shaikh Abu Naser Jr. School.
Kusli Khan Saheb Sheikh Mosarraf Hossain Jr. School.
Patgati Jr. School.

Madrasa
Gaohordanga Madrasa
Darul Ulam Gaohordanga Madrasha (Kawmi)
Bashbaria Jhanjhania Islamia Madrasha (Kawmi)
Gimadanga Senior Madrasha (Alia)
Gimadanga Gozalia Mohila Fazil Madrasha (Alia)

Notable people
 Abul Hassan, poet, was born at Barnigram in Tungipara in 1947. 
 Shamsul Haque Faridpuri, Islamic scholar
 Sheikh Hasina, Prime Minister, was born in Tungipara in 1947.
 Sheikh Mujibur Rahman, Father of the Nation, was born in Tungipara in 1920.

See also 
 Districts of Bangladesh
 Divisions of Bangladesh
 Upazilas of Bangladesh

References 

Upazilas of Gopalganj District, Bangladesh